The Michigan Wolverines men's basketball program is a college basketball team that represents the University of Michigan. The team plays at the Division I level of the National Collegiate Athletic Association (NCAA). They compete in the Big Ten Conference of the NCAA, where they have been since 1917. They play their home games at Crisler Center in Ann Arbor, Michigan, named after Fritz Crisler, a former head football coach at Michigan (1938–1947).

The men's team has had 17 head coaches in its history. The team has played in 2,538 games over 103 seasons of collegiate play from the 1908–09 season to the 2018–19 season (excluding 1910 to 1917, when the Wolverines did not play due to low attendance and lack of interest), compiling a record of 1,504–1,041 (.591).

Steve Fisher is the first and only head coach to have led the team to an NCAA Tournament championship, doing so in 1989. He also led the team to six other NCAA Tournament appearances, including two runner-up finishes in 1992 and 1993, but the '92 and '93 Final Fours were vacated as punishment for the University of Michigan basketball scandal. Before Fisher, Bill Frieder had led the team to four consecutive tournament appearances. Seven coaches have led the team to Big Ten Regular Season Championships: E. J. Mather, George Veenker, Ozzie Cowles, Dave Strack, Johnny Orr, Frieder, and John Beilein. Brian Ellerbe led the team to a Big Ten tournament championship, but that victory was vacated in 2002 in wake of the scandal. Beilein was the winningest head coach for the team, where he led the team to two Big Ten Regular Season Championships in 2012 and 2014 and two Big Ten tournament Championships in 2017 and 2018. He has also led the team to nine NCAA tournament appearances, including eight times in nine years from 2011–19. During these appearances, he led the team to two runner-up finishes in the tournament in 2013 and 2018, two Elite Eight appearances in 2014 and 2018, and three consecutive Sweet Sixteen appearance from 2017–19. As of 2019, Juwan Howard is the current head coach.

List of coaches

Notes
 - Michigan had comprised an on-court record of 1656–1061 (.610), but records from the 1992 NCAA Tournament Final Four, 1992–93, 1995–96, 1996–97, 1997–98 and 1998–99 seasons were vacated due to the University of Michigan basketball scandal.

References
General

Specific

Michigan
 
Michigan Wolverines basketball coaches